Gjimnazi Zenel Hajdini is a high school in Gjilan, Kosovo, and it was founded in 1945. In 1964 it took the name of People's Hero Zenel Hajdini. In 1969 the Turkish language started to be taught along with the Albanian language and Serbian languages. A new building hosted the school in 1973. Today the school hosts around 2,300 students.

Organization

The "Zenel Hajdini" Gymnasium works under the frameworks and curriculum of the MEST of the Republic of Kosovo, and it is one of the most successful gymnasiums in the Balkans Peninsula. Teaching is offered in Albanian and Turkish, with Albanian being the main teaching language. It is one of the most competitive high schools in Kosovo, with annual applications far exceeding the available spots.

Notes

References

Schools in Gjilan
Secondary schools in Kosovo
Education in Gjilan